Herpetogramma exculta is a moth in the family Crambidae. It was described by Thomas Pennington Lucas in 1892. It is found in Australia, where it has been recorded from Queensland.

References

Moths described in 1892
Herpetogramma
Moths of Australia